The Slovakia women's national softball team is the national team of the Slovakia. It is governed by the Slovenska Softballova Asociacia.

Results
 World Championship

 nc = not competed

 European Championship

 nc = not competed

References

External links
 Official National Federation website
 International Softball Federation

Softball
Women's national softball teams
Softball in Slovakia